The 2009 season was the 97th season of soccer in the United States.
This season included playing in the 2009 FIFA Confederations Cup and the 2009 CONCACAF Gold Cup.

National team

Men

Senior

The home team or the team that is designated as the home team is listed in the left column; the away team is in the right

column.

Women

Senior

The United States Women's National Soccer Team was coached by Pia Sundhage.

Algarve Cup

International Friendlies

Major League Soccer

Table

Playoffs

MLS Cup

USL First Division

Table

Purple indicates league title clinched.
Green indicates playoff berth clinched.
1Austin was docked two points for fielding an ineligible player during a match against Montreal Impact on July 25, 2009.

Playoffs
Teams will be re-seeded for semifinal matchups

Finals

Montreal wins on aggregate 6–3.

USL Second Division

Table

Purple indicates league title clinched
Green indicates playoff berth clinched

Playoffs

Final

Lamar Hunt U.S. Open Cup

Home teams listed on top of bracket

Final

American clubs in international competitions

Houston Dynamo

Columbus Crew

D.C. United

New York Red Bulls

Chicago Fire

New England Revolution

Chivas USA

Kansas City Wizards

Los Angeles Galaxy

References
 American competitions at RSSSF
 American national team matches at RSSSF

 
Seasons in American soccer